Farhad Piroutpour (born 21 February 1991 in Mahabad) is an Iranian volleyball player who plays as an opposite hitter for the Iranian national team. He made his debut for the national team in the game against USA in the 2015 World League. He was part of national team in the 2015 Asian Championship.

Honours

National team
Asian Championship
Silver medal (1): 2015

Individual
Best Opposite Spiker: 2015 Asian Championship

References

1991 births
Living people
Iranian men's volleyball players
People from Mahabad
Universiade medalists in volleyball
Universiade gold medalists for Iran
Medalists at the 2017 Summer Universiade
Islamic Solidarity Games competitors for Iran